The 1883 Wellington City mayoral election was part of the New Zealand local elections held that same year to decide who would take the office of Mayor of Wellington.

Background
Incumbent mayor George Fisher sought re-election for a third term and was successful, seeing off a challenge from former mayor William Hutchison. The election was noted for its account of the intensely personal manner in which the two candidates publicly attacked each other in speeches. Reporters at the time stating "The contest assumed the character of a personal duel, the abuse becoming deplorably bitter towards the last day."

Election results
The following table gives the election results:

Notes

References

Mayoral elections in Wellington
1883 elections in New Zealand
Politics of the Wellington Region
1880s in Wellington
November 1883 events